Joseph Leiper (born 15 March 1873) was a Scottish professional footballer who played as a full-back.

References

1873 births
People from Govan
Scottish footballers
Association football defenders
Minerva F.C. players
Partick Thistle F.C. players
Derby County F.C. players
Grimsby Town F.C. players
Chesterfield F.C. players
Motherwell F.C. players
Hull City A.F.C. players
Aberdare Town F.C. players
Belper Town F.C. players
English Football League players
Year of death missing
FA Cup Final players